2-Methyl-2,4-pentanediol (MPD) is an organic compound with the formula (CH3)2C(OH)CH2CH(OH)CH3.  This colourless liquid is a chiral diol.  It is produced industrially from diacetone alcohol by hydrogenation. Total European and USA production was 15000 tonnes in 2000.

2-Methyl-2,4-pentanediol exists as two enantiomers, (4R)-(-) and (4S)-(+).  In the Protein Data Bank, the 3-letter code "MPD" refers to the (S)-(-) enantiomer, while "MRD" is used to refer to the (R)-(+) version.  Commercial products labeled "MPD" are usually the racemate, also sold as and referred to as "hexylene glycol".

Uses
2-Methyl-2,4-pentanediol exhibits both surfactant and emulsion-stabilizing properties. Its relatively high viscosity and low volatility are advantageous in coatings, cleansers, cosmetics, solvents, and hydraulic fluids.   Although it is an irritant at higher concentrations, it is sometimes used in skin care, hair care, soap, and eye cosmetic products at concentrations ranging from 0.1% - 25%.

It is biodegradable and unlikely to accumulate in the environment.

Laboratory uses
In the laboratory it is a common precipitant and cryoprotectant in protein crystallography. Since hexylene glycol is compatible with polar and nonpolar molecules, it competes with the solvent in a crystallography experiment causing the protein to precipitate. Hexylene glycol is so effective in protein crystallography because its amphiphilic nature and small, flexible structure allows it to bind to many different locations on a protein secondary structure including alpha helices and beta sheets. When hexylene glycol binds to these different locations, water is removed and the protein crystals anneal, which prevents ice formation during cryocrystallography techniques. Incorporation of hexylene glycol into solution has been known to improve the resolution of X-ray diffraction making protein structures easily identifiable. Additionally hexylene glycol is not a strong denaturing agent and thus does not significantly alter the structure of a protein during the crystallography procedure.

Like related diols, it forms borate esters.

References

Alkanediols